Contact is the second album by German singer Fancy. It was released in 1986 from Metronome Records.

Track listing

Charts

References

External links 

 

1986 albums
Fancy (singer) albums